Dumortieria is a genus of ammonites belonging to the family Graphoceratidae.

Fossil record
These cephalopods were fast-moving nektonic carnivores. They lived in the Late Jurassic, upper Toarcian age  (from about 180.1 to 175.6 million years ago). Fossils of species within this genus can be found in Bulgaria, Canada, France, Germany, Hungary, Iran, Italy, Spain and Tunisia.

Description

Dumortiera are rather similar to  Grammoceras and Catulloceras from the same age, having a thin, discoidally evolute shell with simple, gently sigmoid ribbing and a low ventral keel, but this species has a les rounded venter and Catulloceras has a subquadrate whorl section.

Species
Species within this genus include:
 Dumortieria brancoi Benecke 1905
 Dumortieria costula Reinecke 1818
 Dumortieria gundershofensis Haug 1887
 Dumortieria insignisimilis Braun 1867
 Dumortieria jamesoni (Sow.)
 Dumortieria kochi Benecke 1905
 Dumortieria latumbilicata Geczy 1967
 Dumortieria levesquei d'Orbigny 1844
 Dumortieria meneghinii Zittel 1887
 Dumortieria moorei Lycett 1857
 Dumortieria prisca Buckman 1891
 Dumortieria pseudoradiosa Branco 1879
 Dumortieria radians Reinecke 1818
 Dumortieria radiosa Seebach 1864
 Dumortieria rustica Buckman 1902
 Dumortieria sparsicosta Haug 1887
 Dumortieria striatulocostata Quenstedt 1885
 Dumortieria tabulata Buckman 1892

See also
List of ammonite genera

References 

Hildoceratidae
Ammonitida genera